Hancıgaz is a village in the Eyyübiye district of Şanlıurfa Province, Turkey. As of the 1990 census, it had a population of 840. The village is the site of an 8-meter-tall archaeological mound where a survey found Chalcolithic and Byzantine-era remains.

References 

Villages in Şanlıurfa Province